Kitsap County is located in the U.S. state of Washington. As of the 2020 census, its population was 275,611. Its county seat is Port Orchard, and its largest city is Bremerton. The county was formed out of King County and Jefferson County on January 16, 1857, and is named for Chief Kitsap of the Suquamish Tribe. Originally named Slaughter County, it was soon renamed.

Kitsap County comprises the Bremerton-Silverdale, WA Metropolitan Statistical Area, which is also included in the Seattle-Tacoma, WA Combined Statistical Area.

The United States Navy is the largest employer in the county, with installations at Puget Sound Naval Shipyard, Naval Undersea Warfare Center Keyport, and Naval Base Kitsap (which comprises former NSB Bangor and NS Bremerton).

Kitsap County is connected to the eastern shore of Puget Sound by Washington State Ferries routes, including the Seattle-Bremerton Ferry, Southworth to West Seattle via Vashon Island, Bainbridge Island to Downtown Seattle, and from Kingston to Edmonds, Washington. Kitsap Transit provides passenger-only fast ferry service between Bremerton and Seattle, Kingston and Seattle, and Southworth and Seattle.

History
The Kitsap Peninsula was originally acquired by the U.S. Government in three pieces by three treaties negotiated with the Native American tribes:

 The Treaty of Medicine Creek, signed 26 December 1854, ratified 3 March 1855
 The Treaty of Point Elliott, signed 22 January 1855, ratified 11 April 1859
 Point No Point Treaty, signed 26 January 1855, ratified 8 March 1859.

Territorial Governor Isaac Stevens represented the United States in all three negotiations.

When the Washington Territory was organized in 1853, the Kitsap Peninsula was divided between King County to the east and Jefferson County to the west. Official public papers were required to be filed at the county seat, which meant Peninsula business people had to travel to either Seattle or Port Townsend to transact business. On the understanding that they would "bring home a new county," area mill operators George Meigs and William Renton supported the candidacies to the Territorial Legislature of two employees from their respective mills: Timothy Duane Hinckley from Meigs' and S.B. Wilson from Renton's.

Upon arrival in Olympia, the two men introduced bills to create a new county, to be named "Madison".  Representative Abernathy from Wahkiakum County proposed an amendment to name it "Slaughter", in recognition of Lt. William Alloway Slaughter, who had been killed in 1855 in the Yakima War. The bill passed as amended. It was signed by Governor Isaac Stevens on January 16, 1857.  The county seat would be located in Meigs's mill town at Port Madison.

In Slaughter County's first election on July 13, 1857, voters were given the opportunity to rename the county. The options were "Mill", "Madison" or "Kitsap". Slaughter was not one of the options. Kitsap won by an overwhelming majority.

Geography
It is the fourth-smallest county in Washington by land area and third-smallest by total area.

In addition to occupying most of the Kitsap Peninsula, Kitsap County includes both Bainbridge Island and Blake Island.

The portion of the county north of Silverdale is often referred to as North Kitsap, and the portion south of Bremerton as South Kitsap.

Geographic features

Bainbridge Island
Blake Island
Colvos Passage
Dyes Inlet
Hood Canal
Kitsap Peninsula
Liberty Bay
Port Gamble
Port Madison
Port Orchard
Puget Sound
Sinclair Inlet
Blue Hills
Seattle Fault Zone
Kitsap Lake

Adjacent counties
Island County - northeast
Snohomish County - east
King County - east/southeast
Pierce County - south/southeast
Mason County - southwest
Jefferson County - northwest

Demographics

2010 census
As of the 2010 census, there were 251,133 people, 97,220 households, and 65,820 families residing in the county. The racial makeup of the county was 82.6% white, 4.9% Asian, 2.6% black or African American, 1.6% American Indian, 0.9% Pacific islander, 1.6% from other races, and 5.8% from two or more races. Those of Hispanic or Latino origin made up 6.2% of the population. In terms of ancestry, 21.3% were German, 14.4% were Irish, 13.8% were English, 7.1% were Norwegian, and 4.2% were American.

Of the 97,220 households, 31.7% had children under the age of 18 living with them, 53.2% were married couples living together, 10.2% had a female householder with no husband present, 32.3% were non-families, and 25.2% of all households were made up of individuals. The average household size was 2.49 and the average family size was 2.97. The median age was 39.4 years.

The median income for a household in the county was $59,549 and the median income for a family was $71,065. Males had a median income of $52,282 versus $38,499 for females. The per capita income for the county was $29,755. About 6.1% of families and 9.4% of the population were below the poverty line, including 11.8% of those under age 18 and 5.3% of those age 65 or over.

Communities

Cities
Bainbridge Island
Bremerton
Port Orchard (county seat)
Poulsbo

Census-designated places

Bangor Base
Bethel
Burley
Chico
East Port Orchard
Enetai
Erlands Point
Gorst
Hansville
Indianola
Keyport
Kingston
Kitsap Lake
Lofall
Manchester
Navy Yard City
Parkwood
Port Gamble Tribal Community
Rocky Point
Seabeck
Silverdale
Southworth
Suquamish
Tracyton

Other unincorporated communities

Annapolis
Bay Vista
Breidablick
Brownsville
Camp Union
Central Valley
 Clear Creek
Crosby
Eglon
Fernwood
Fragaria
Gilberton
Glenwood
Harper
Holly
Horseshoe Lake
Illahee
Island Lake
Kariotis
Lofall
Lone Rock
Long Lake
Olalla
Olalla Valley
Scandia
South Colby
South Park Village
Virginia
Waterman
Wautauga Beach
Wildcat Lake
Wye Lake

Politics
Kitsap County is generally considered to be a relatively Democratic area.  In the 2016 U.S. presidential election, Democrat Hillary Clinton received 49.05% of the vote to Republican Donald Trump's 38.07%. This Democratic margin widened in 2020, with candidate Joe Biden receiving 56.90% of the vote versus incumbent Trump receiving 38.80%.

On mainland Kitsap County, politics are strongly influenced by working-class Bremerton, which casts moderate margins for Democratic candidates. Unincorporated Kitsap County is a mix of battleground areas. Non-Bremerton parts of incorporated mainland Kitsap County vary, with Silverdale having become a Republican stronghold, Poulsbo marginally Democratic, and Port Orchard consistently electing Republican candidates.

Democrats typically carry the Indian reservations of the area by wide margins; the area around Little Boston (part of the S'Klallam Indian Reservation) regularly votes for Democratic candidates.

The Kitsap County Auditor Website has detailed election results from 1998 to the present.  County area political trends can be tracked by analyzing the election precinct data.

Government

Board of County Commissioners
Ed Wolfe (R) - District #3, Central Kitsap. 
Wolfe became the first elected Republican county commissioner since Jan Angel was elected South Kitsap Commissioner in 2004. Wolfe replaced Linda Streissguth (D), who had been appointed in January 2014 to replace Josh Brown (D). Prior to his election, he was a local attorney specializing in litigation and business law. Commissioner Wolfe served with the U.S. State Department during the Ronald Reagan and George H.W. Bush administrations as Deputy Assistant Secretary of State for Oceans and Fisheries Affairs with the rank of ambassador.

Charlotte Garrido (D) - District #2, South Kitsap. 
Garrido was re-elected in Nov. 2012, when she defeated Linda Simpson. Commissioner Garrido previously served on the county commission from 1997 to 2000 and again from 2009 to 2012.

Robert Gelder (D) District #1, North Kitsap. 
Gelder was appointed to replace Steve Bauer, who resigned in March 2011.

State legislators

23rd Legislative District
Bainbridge Island, East Bremerton, Poulsbo and Silverdale
Sen. Christine Rolfes (D) - Elected Nov 2012. 
Rep. Tarra Simmons (D) - First elected Nov. 2020.
Rep. Drew Hansen (D) - Appointed Sept. 2011 to replace Christine Rolfes who had been appointed to the Senate. First elected in Nov. 2012.

26th Legislative District
Bremerton, Gig Harbor and Port Orchard
Sen. Emily Randall (D)
Rep. Jesse Young (R)
Rep. Michelle Caldier (R)

35th Legislative District
Bremerton, Shelton and Mason County
Sen. Tim Sheldon (D)* (Caucuses with Republicans)
Rep. Dan Griffey (R)
Rep. Drew C. MacEwen (R)

Education

Post-secondary education
Olympic College

Public schools
Bainbridge Island School District
Bremerton School District
Central Kitsap School District
North Kitsap School District
South Kitsap School District

Transportation
Kitsap County is connected to the eastern shore of Puget Sound by several Washington State Ferries routes, including the Seattle-Bremerton Ferry, Southworth to West Seattle via Vashon Island, Bainbridge Island to Downtown Seattle, and from Kingston to Edmonds, Washington.

Kitsap Transit provides local transit service within Kitsap County and connects to other transit systems that continue onto the Olympic Peninsula. The agency launched its fast ferry services to Seattle in July 2017, beginning initially with a Bremerton route and later expanding to Kingston in 2018. Fast ferry service to Southworth is expected to begin in 2020.

The county is connected to Jefferson County and the Olympic Peninsula to the west by the Hood Canal Bridge.

A  government-owned rail line, the Bangor-Shelton-Bremerton Navy Railroad, runs through the county. It is a branch off the Puget Sound and Pacific Railroad, with its junction at Shelton.  At the Bremerton Junction near Gorst a spur follows Highway 3 along the shore of the Sinclair Inlet terminating at the Puget Sound Naval Ship Yard, the other follows Highway 3 along the western shore of Dyes Inlet, servicing Bangor Naval Submarine Base. The Navy had originally intended to use armored trains to transport nuclear missiles to Bangor for the Trident submarines but protesters and a series of court decisions derailed the plan. Today the railroad is primarily used to transport scrap from PSNS.

Notable people
Tarn Adams, programmer and game designer, creator of Dwarf Fortress and other games
Nathan Adrian, swimmer and Olympic gold medalist
Ben Gibbard, musician
Richard F. Gordon Jr., naval officer and aviator, test pilot, and NASA astronaut
Russell Johnson, actor, best known as The Professor on TV's Gilligan's Island.
James Kelsey, sculptor
Debbie Macomber, best-selling romance novelist
Gregg Olsen, best-selling mystery/crime novelist
Benji Olson, NFL player for Tennessee Titans
Delilah Rene, radio personality, author and songwriter
Bree Schaaf, 2010 Winter Olympics competitor in bobsled. 
Aaron Sele, former all-star MLB pitcher.
Ben Shepherd, bass player of Seattle rock band Soundgarden
Scott Shipley, slalom canoeist
Marvin Williams, NBA player for the Atlanta Hawks
Andrew Wood, lead singer of Seattle rock band Mother Love Bone

In popular culture
Walking Tall with The Rock and Johnny Knoxville was based in Kitsap County, and the City of Port Orchard is the basis for the fictional community of Cedar Cove in the books by Debbie Macomber.

See also
National Register of Historic Places listings in Kitsap County, Washington

Notes

References

Bibliography

External links

Kitsap County official website
Kitsap County USGenWeb
Kitsap Peninsula Visitor and Convention Bureau
Kitsap Economic Development Alliance
Kitsap Historical Society and Museum 

 
Washington placenames of Native American origin
1857 establishments in Washington Territory
Populated places established in 1857
Seattle metropolitan area
Western Washington